Paulette Doan (married name: Ormsby) is a Canadian former ice dancer.  She competed with Kenneth Ormsby.  Together, they were the 1963 and 1964 Canadian champions and in those years won bronze and silver medals (respectively) at the World Figure Skating Championships.

During her competitive career she lived in Toronto and was also enrolled in a secretarial course.

After the 1964 season, Doan and Ormsby turned professional and toured with Ice Follies.  They announced their engagement the day they joined the show.

As of 2020, Paulette Ormsby is on the coaching staff at the Scarboro Figure Skating Club in Toronto, Ontario.

Results
(with Kenneth Ormsby)

 Doan and Ormsby competed in both the junior and senior events at the 1961 Canadian Championships.

References

Canadian female ice dancers
World Figure Skating Championships medalists
Living people
Year of birth missing (living people)